Roderick Arthur Ennis Webb (22 July 1910 – 1 October 1999) was a Progressive Conservative party member of the House of Commons of Canada. He was born in Toronto, Ontario and became an electrician and merchant by career.

He was first elected at the Hastings—Frontenac riding in a 5 October 1959 by-election then re-elected there in the 1962, 1963 and 1965 federal elections. After completing his final House of Commons term in 1968, the 27th Canadian Parliament, Rod Webb did not seek further re-election.

External links
 

1910 births
1999 deaths
Members of the House of Commons of Canada from Ontario
Politicians from Toronto
Progressive Conservative Party of Canada MPs